Fakhr ol Din may refer to:
 Fakhr ol Din, North Khorasan
 Fakhr ol Din, South Khorasan